Samuel Herbert Bithell (19 November 1900 – 18 October 1969) was an English professional footballer who played in the Football League for Southport as a forward.

Career statistics

Honours 
Burscough Rangers

 Rall-Walker Cup: 1921–22

References

English footballers
English Football League players
Association football inside forwards
1900 births
1969 deaths
Association football outside forwards
People from Hindley, Greater Manchester
Southport F.C. players
Burnley F.C. players